Green Tobacco Sickness (GTS) is a type of nicotine poisoning caused by the transdermal absorption of nicotine from the surface of wet tobacco plants. Tobacco harvesters, whose clothings become saturated from tobacco wet with rain or morning dew, are at high risk of developing GTS. Workers can avoid getting this sickness by waiting to harvest until the tobacco leaves are dry, or by wearing a  rain suit. Wet clothing that has come in contact with tobacco leaves should be removed immediately and the skin should be washed with warm soapy water.

Nicotine from other sources, including nicotine gum, a nicotine patch or electronic cigarette, or other tobacco products like cigarettes or smokeless tobacco, appears to reduce the risk of GTS due to the body adapting to the intake of nicotine.

Symptoms of GTS include nausea, vomiting, headache, dizziness, and severe weakness. These symptoms may be accompanied by fluctuations in blood pressure or heart rate. Abdominal cramping, chills, increased sweating, salivation and difficulty breathing are also common. The illness will resolve on its own within one to two days, but symptoms may be so severe as to require emergency medical treatment.

Worldwide there are an estimated 33 million tobacco farm workers, with a substantial proportion living in developing countries. A recent international review reported that between 8-89% of tobacco harvesters may be affected in the course of a season (this wide variation probably being due to differences between study methodologies as well as a range of working conditions). The long-term health outcomes for individuals exposed to nicotine transdermally for extended periods of time are not known.

References

Further reading 
 Recommended Practices: Green Tobacco Sickness, from National Institute for Occupational Safety and Health and the Occupational Safety and Health Administration.
 Warning to tobacco harvesters, from the National Institute for Occupational Safety and Health.
 Learning About Green Tobacco Sickness, from the National Agricultural Safety Database.
 Quandt SA, et al. Migrant farmworkers and Green Tobacco Sickness: New issues for understudied disease. Am J Ind Med. 2000;37:307-315.

Agricultural health and safety
Health effects of tobacco